Robin Kenyatta (March 6, 1942 – October 26, 2004) was an American jazz alto saxophonist.

Early life
Born Robert Prince Haynes in Moncks Corner, South Carolina, Kenyatta grew up in New York City and began playing the saxophone at age 14. He was mostly self-taught, learning alto, tenor, and soprano saxophones and flute, but received encouragement and help from professional musicians such as John Handy.

Career 
Kenyatta joined the United States Army in 1962 and played in a military band for two years. Upon being discharged, he returned to New York and adopted the name Kenyatta as a tribute to Jomo Kenyatta, the Kenyan anti-colonial activist, and began pursuing a career as a professional musician.

In 1964, Bill Dixon heard Kenyatta and invited him to participate in the October Revolution in Jazz. On December 28 of that year, Kenyatta played as a member of the Bill Dixon Quintet as part of the Four Days in December concert series at Judson Hall, substituting for Giuseppi Logan, who was injured. According to Dixon biographer Benjamin Young, "Kenyatta became such an effective part of the group as Logan was recovering that the latter never rejoined Dixon's outfit." During this time, he met John Coltrane, who praised his playing. Kenyatta performed with Dixon's group again at the Contemporary Center from March 19–20, 1965, and with the Jazz Composer's Orchestra at the same location from April 9–11 of that year. He also appeared on the Jazz Composer's Orchestra album Communication, recorded on April 10.

Later that year, Kenyatta made his first recorded appearance on the album Portrait In Soul by pianist and composer Valerie Capers. In 1966, he appeared on Sonny Stitt's album Deuces Wild, as well as Roswell Rudd's Everywhere and Dixon's Intents and Purposes. He released Until, his first album as a leader, the following year.

In 1969, Kenyatta moved to Paris, France, where he continued to perform and record, releasing Beggars & Stealers and Girl from Martinique under his own name. In 1972, he moved back to New York, and recorded three albums that were more mainstream than his previous releases, Gypsy Man, Terra Nova, and Stompin' at the Savoy, for Atlantic Records. He also released a version of the theme from "Last Tango in Paris" during this time. In the mid-1970s, he moved to Lausanne, Switzerland, where he taught music at the Ecole de Jazz Musique Actuelle and founded the Hello Jazz Music School and shop. Throughout the 1970s, he recorded as a sideman for Alan Silva, Andrew Hill, Oscar Brown, Ted Curson, Sam Rivers, and Archie Shepp.

During the 1980s and 1990s, Kenyatta performed at major jazz festivals with Dizzy Gillespie, Paul Simon, George Benson, B.B. King, The Isley Brothers, and other major artists. He also continued to record under his own name, trying "to find a comfortable middle ground between fusion, instrumental pop, and his hard bop and free music roots."

In 2001, Kenyatta moved back to New York and commuted to a teaching position at Bentley University in Waltham, Massachusetts. In 2003, he released a funk and blues-influenced album titled Cool Blue.

Death 
In 2004, he flew to Lausanne for a performance, but died in his sleep on October 26.

Discography

As leader
 1967: Until (Vortex, reissued on Wounded Bird)
 1969: Beggars & Stealers (Muse) with Larry Willis, Walter Booker, Alphonse Mouzon
 1970: Girl from Martinique (ECM) with Wolfgang Dauner, Arild Andersen, Fred Braceful
 1972: Free State Band  (America) with Aldo Romano, Kent Carter
 1972: Gypsy Man (Atlantic) with Billy Cobham, Rick Marotta, Stanley Clarke, Larry Willis, David Spinozza
 1973: Terra Nova (Atlantic) with Pat Rebillot, Sonny Burke, Ron Carter, Gladstone Anderson, Winston Grennan, Enrico Rava
 1974: Stompin' at the Savoy (Atlantic) with Dr. John, Ron Carter, Lew Soloff, Bernard Purdie, Chuck Rainey
 1975: Nomusa (Muse) with Stafford James, Joe Chambers, Dom Salvador
 1976: Encourage the People (Wolf) with Arthur Jenkins, Richard Tee, Ralph MacDonald, Hugh McCracken
 1979: Take the Heat off Me (ITM) with Lew Soloff, Dom Salvador, Peter Solomon, David Eubanks, Sal Cuevas, Cornell Dupree
 1987: Live at Cully: Blues for Mama Doll (Jazz Dance)
 1991: Ghost Stories featuring Ronnie Burrage (ITM)
 2003: Cool Blue (Jazz Dance)

As sideman
With Oscar Brown Jr.
 Brother Where Are You (Atlantic, 1974)

With Valerie Capers
 Portrait in Soul (Atlantic, 1966)

With Ted Curson
 Quicksand (Atlantic, 1974)

With Bill Dixon
 Intents and Purposes (1967)

With Andrew Hill
 Spiral (1975)

With Jazz Composer's Orchestra
 Communication (JCO, 1965)

With Sam Rivers
 Crystals (Impulse!, 1974)

With Roswell Rudd
 Everywhere (Impulse!, 1966) also released as part of Mixed in 1998
 Blown Bone (Emanem, 2006) (appears on one track)

With Archie Shepp
 For Losers (Impulse!, 1971)
 Kwanza (Impulse!, 1974)

With Alan Silva
 Seasons (BYG Actuel, 1971)
 My Country (Leo, 1989)

With Sonny Stitt
 Deuces Wild (Atlantic, 1966)

References

External links
 

1942 births
2004 deaths
People from Moncks Corner, South Carolina
American jazz alto saxophonists
American jazz soprano saxophonists
American male saxophonists
American jazz flautists
Jazz-blues saxophonists
Musicians from South Carolina
Muse Records artists
20th-century American saxophonists
20th-century American male musicians
American male jazz musicians
20th-century flautists